The following is a list of white defendants executed for killing a black victim. Executions of white defendants for killing black victims are rare. Since the reinstatement of capital punishment in the United States in 1976, just 21 white people have been executed for killing a black person (less than 1.36 percent of all executions), whereas the number of black people executed for killing a white person is 299 (making up nearly 19.4 percent of all executions). Additionally, a further 12 white people have been executed for killing a black person and another person, or people, of a different race.

List of white defendants executed for killing a black victim in the United States since 1976

See also
 List of death row inmates in the United States
 List of United States Supreme Court decisions on capital punishment
 List of women executed in the United States since 1976
 Race and capital punishment in the United States
 Racism against Black Americans

References

American people convicted of murder
White defendants executed for killing a black victim
People executed for murder